The Misconceptions of Us is the third studio album released by South Korean boy band Shinee. It consists of two parts, Dream Girl – The Misconceptions of You and the second Why So Serious? – The Misconceptions of Me, that were later collected together as The Misconceptions of Us under the seal of the label SM Entertainment and distributed by KT Music.

Background

Dream Girl – The Misconceptions of You

On February 11, Shinee revealed that the title song "Dream Girl" was produced by Hyuk Shin and his team Joombas Music Factory, and described it as "an acid electro funk song". Several days later, the group held the event "Melon Premiere Shinee Music Spoiler" where they revealed six out of the nine songs on the album to 100 music reviewers, as well as a song and a medley of three songs from Why So Serious? – The Misconceptions of Me. Two of the directors for the album also made an appearance to give a basic explanation about the concepts and meanings behind the project.
Director Lee Sung-soo from SM Entertainment's production department shared information about the songs and their meanings, while Director Min Hee-jin from SM Entertainment's visual and art directing department introduced Shinee's visual concept. Furthermore, the choreography for the title song "Dream Girl" was revealed, which was choreographed by Tony Testa, who previously worked with Shinee on "Sherlock (Clue + Note)". The making of the music video was also shown which showed the members jumping on trampolines and using running machines. Member Onew stated on the making of the two albums, "It's our first full album that we're releasing in a while, so we worked really hard. Minho and Key worked on the rapping, Jonghyun worked on the lyrics, and Taemin worked on the choreography." Taemin described the album as one where each member's individuality shines through their voices, "We know each other best so a lot of our opinions went into this album." Jonghyun added, "Taemin's delivery of the lyrics is good. Minho's falsetto is really nice these days. Key is good at English. We know each other's strengths so we split the parts up according to who can shine on what. We had fun working on the album."

This album is about "my misconception of you", "the misconception of the world wrapped around me", and "the misconception of reality". The lyrics can be interpreted as the dreams, ideals, and visions of the world through Shinee's eyes. It showcases the original Shinee-esque side which everyone is familiar with.

Why So Serious? – The Misconceptions of Me

Why So Serious? – The Misconceptions of Me was described as having a darker vibe compared to Dream Girl – The Misconceptions of You. Jonghyun stated, "Why So Serious – The Misconceptions of Me will show our worldview. It will have a deep and rough sound. It embodies our group's unique personality and musical sensation". In a video interview with Billboard, Shinee said the song titles to Why So Serious? – The Misconceptions of Me were revealed in Dream Girl – The Misconceptions of Yous opening track, "Spoiler." Jonghyun stated "Spoiler" is the main song connecting the two albums.  Fellow SM Entertainment artist Shim Changmin wrote the song "Sleepless Night" for the group, making this his first time writing outside a TVXQ release.

Lee Sung-soo explained that the album is about "the misconception of me (Shinee)," "the dreams I slowly wanted for myself" and "the misconception of ideals." It evokes the gap between Shinee's reality and dreams and has an overall deep and dark sound, completely opposite of the preceding album." Lee also said that there are hidden keywords that connect the songs in the two albums and, "We included a fun point where you can search for keywords and put them together to create several interpretations."

Composition

Dream Girl – The Misconceptions of You
"Dream Girl" was produced by Hyuk Shin and his team of composers, Joombas Music Factory. They described the song as "an acid electro funk song". It is written by Jun Gandi and composed by Hyuk Shin, Jordan Kyle, Ross Lara, Dave Cook, DK, and Anthony "TC" Crawford. The song has a fuller sound, featuring electric guitars among various other synths and the beat is very diverse and complex with a lot of tempo changes. The song is described as the most "Shinee-like song" in the album and tells about how the five boys meet their dream girl that only appears in their dreams, and disappears in reality.

Why So Serious? – The Misconceptions of Me
"Why So Serious?" is a funk rock dance track that was chosen as the title track and lead single from the album. The song was written and produced by Kenzie and composed by Kim Cheong-bae, Andrew Choi and Kenzie. It is a genre that combines the powerful and catchy melody of pop with electronica sounds. It talks wittily about a zombie that has lived in darkness for a very long time who falls in love with a human girl.  "Shine (Medusa I)" is a powerful dance track that "combines high quality lyrics that express the love of fans as a 'shine' together with tough drum sounds to add enjoyment to listeners".  Teddy Riley, Andrew Choi and Kim Tae-seong composed the song, with lyrics penned by Misfit and Minho. "Sleepless Night" is a ballad song accompanied by bittersweet tunes of piano. The song was produced by a Canadian songwriter, Matthew Tishler, in his debut collaboration with Shinee, and Im Kwang-ok. Shim Changmin of TVXQ penned the lyrics, while Shinee's resident rapper Minho yet again contributed to the rap portion.

The Misconceptions of Us
"Selene 6.23" is a collaboration with the classical pianist Yiruma. It is a medium tempo pop ballad integrated with elements of modern orchestra. The instrumental of the piece was composed by Yiruma. "Selene 6.23" is the first collaboration between Yiruma and Shinee. The music producers are Ted Kim and 2Face. The lyrics were penned by Jonghyun.

Release and promotion
Dream Girl – The Misconceptions of You was released digitally on February 19, 2013, alongside lead single "Dream Girl". The physical edition was released a day later. The music video premiered on February 19 and features the group doing unique tricks with mic stands that are noted to be the highlight of the dance routine, choreographed by Tony Testa. The music video is the work of Digipedi, a South Korean video production company formed and led by the duo Seong Won-mo and Park Sang-woo. A Japanese version of "Dream Girl", written by Hidenori Tanaka and agehasprings, was later included as one of the three tracks on Shinee's eighth Japanese single "Boys Meet U", which was released on August 21, 2013, under the distributing label of EMI Music Japan. Before its release, the song was performed live during their second Japan arena tour Shinee World 2013.

Why So Serious? – The Misconceptions of Me was released digitally on April 26, 2013, and physically on April 29, 2013. "Why So Serious?" served as the lead single and was released simultaneously with the music video on April 26. The music video was filmed in Cheongdam-dong and Namyangju in early April, featuring choreography by Devin Jamieson, who previously worked with the group's labelmates Super Junior.  Both the dance and the story present in the music video are reminiscent of the lyrics to the song; as "Why So Serious?" begins describing a zombie's awakening, Shinee lies down on the floor and reaches toward the sky. 
Jonghyun was unable to participate in the music video and the early stages of album promotions due to injuries sustained during a car accident. SM Entertainment said in a statement, "Jonghyun was discharged from the hospital [...], and until he is fully healed, he’ll be focusing on treatments." He resumed activities on May 23, joining the group for their performance on M Countdown.

The two parts of the album were collected together as The Misconceptions of Us on August 8, 2013. It included two new songs, "Selene 6.23" and "Better Off". The album cover art was designed by Key.

Critical and commercial performance
Billboard K-Town columnist Jeff Benjamin wrote that the lead single, "Dream Girl", is a "safe, enjoyable mainstream single" while the album is "a triumph that never lacks in energy and balances nods to 80s pop stars and forward-thinking pop". He said "songs like 'Punch Drunk Love' and 'Aside' sonically recall the sounds of Michael Jackson and Lionel Richie, respectively", while "tracks like 'Beautiful' and 'Runaway' combine unique electronic production elements over sugary boy band harmonies to create year-round pop music".

Dream Girl – The Misconceptions of You was commercially successful in South Korea—the title track topped the Gaon Digital Chart, while the album charted at number one on the Gaon Album Chart. The album sold over 137,000 copies during the first month of release and more than 180,000 by the end of the year. It was the ninth best-selling album of 2013.

"Why So Serious" peaked at number 15 on the Gaon Digital Chart and number 21 on China's Baidu Singles Chart. As of 2013, the album has sold about 130,000 copies, and as of 2016, the whole Misconceptions series has sold around 360,000 copies in South Korea.

Track listing

Notes
 Minho is credited for the rap lyrics
 Key is credited for the rap lyrics
 JQ is credited for the rap lyrics

Charts

Weekly charts

Monthly charts

Year-end charts

Accolades

Release history

References

External links
  
  
  

Shinee albums
SM Entertainment albums
Genie Music albums
2013 albums
Albums produced by Lee Soo-man
Albums produced by Thomas Troelsen
Korean-language albums